Henry William Pitcher VC (20 December 1841 – 5 July 1875) was an English recipient of the Victoria Cross.

Details
Pitcher was born at Kamptee in British India, the second son of Vincent Pitcher and Rose Mary le Geyt, daughter of Admiral George le Geyt. His elder brother Colonel Duncan George Pitcher also served in India.

He was about 22 years old and a lieutenant in the Bengal Staff Corps, 4th Punjab Infantry, British Indian Army during the Umbeyla Campaign. On 30 October 1863 in North-West India, Lieutenant Pitcher led a party to recapture the Crag Picquet after its garrison had been driven in by the enemy and sixty of them killed. He led the party up the narrow path to the last rock until he was knocked down and stunned by a large stone thrown from above. On 16 November, the lieutenant displayed great courage in leading a party to the Crag Picquet when it had again fallen into enemy hands. He led the first charge, but was wounded in the action. For this deed he was awarded the Victoria Cross.

He later achieved the rank of captain and died of heatstroke, while serving with the 1st Punjab Infantry, on 5 July 1875 at Dehra Ghazi Khan. His VC is on display in Jersey Museum.

Early life
Pitcher is one of five that attended Victoria College, Jersey whom were awarded the Victoria Cross. A replica is on display opposite the Headmasters office in The Main Building.

References

 Spink auction
 VC Purchase of VC by Jersey
 Societe Jersiaise

1841 births
1875 deaths
British recipients of the Victoria Cross
Deaths from hyperthermia
People educated at Victoria College, Jersey
British military personnel of the Umbeyla Campaign
British military personnel of the Indian Rebellion of 1857
Bengal Staff Corps officers
People educated at Christ's Hospital